The Jack Breslin Student Events Center is a multi-purpose arena at Michigan State University in East Lansing, Michigan. The arena opened in 1989, and is named for Jack Breslin, MSU alumnus, former athlete and administrator, who first began pushing for the arena in 1969. It is home to the Michigan State Spartans men's and women's basketball teams. Although it nominally contains 16,280 seats, the arena typically holds around 10,000 for most events depending on the floor or stage setup. In 2022 the women's volleyball team moved its home games from Jenison to the Breslin Center.

The arena's previous basketball court was the same floor where the Spartans won the 2000 NCAA Men's Tournament, which was at the RCA Dome in Indianapolis. The school purchased the floor from the NCAA and Final Four floor installer Horner Flooring (based in Dollar Bay) after the title game, and had a plaque installed on the baseline near the Michigan State tunnel to commemorate the floor's purpose in the school's history. They updated their court before the 2016–2017 season that has a two-toned finish inside the arcs and a large Spartan Head in the middle.

The building not only serves as the home to MSU sports teams, but as the main large performance arena for the Lansing area. The Michigan State Bar Examination, large concerts, commencements, monster truck rallies, and circuses that travel to Mid Michigan are often held at the Breslin Center. With a large arena, it is Lansing's WWE venue. Many events for Michigan State are held here, including a plethora of career fairs and many Greek Life events.

The arena underwent a $50 million renovation starting in January 2016 that went until October 2017. This renovation changed many things about the Breslin, but the most notable was the addition of the Tom Izzo Basketball Hall of History. This addition includes both men's and women's basketball trophies throughout the years, along with tributes to notable former players, previous jerseys, and even a wax figure of Tom Izzo. Another notable addition, donated by Draymond Green, was a new weight room for the players. Other things included in the renovation were a locker room for former players, a players' lounge, and a recruiting room. The concourse was also widened, and improvements were made to the restrooms and concession stands for the benefit of the fans. Quicken Loans founder, Dan Gilbert, donated $15 million to both the addition and a scholarship fund. They named the outside of the Hall of History the Gilbert Pavilion in his honor.

Upgrades
1997 – A color replay board above center court was added, dubbed SpartanVision.
2001 – An expansion added two,  auxiliary gyms and office space.
2005 – A large black drop curtain to close off the upper deck in efforts to make smaller events "less empty" was added.
2006 – The scrolling advertisements were replaced at the score's table with TV screens.
2007 – The home team locker rooms were renovated and the ceilings raised, as players on both the men's and women's teams were approaching 7'.
2010 – The basketball floor was repainted to adopt the new shade of green and the new appearance of MSU Athletics.
2011 – A larger, HD overhead scoreboard and LED rings around the lower concourse were added.
2012 – The basketball floor was repainted again with a larger logo at center court, replacement of MSU logos with a Big Ten logo at the free throw lines, and removal of brighter wood inside the three-point line.
2016 – The basketball floor was repainted again, keeping the large Spartan logo in the center of the court and adding a two-tone design with darker colored wood for the area inside the three-point line and a single random stripe outside the visitors' 3 point line on the right.
2017 – A $50 million renovation added the Tom Izzo Hall of History, a new weight room, a former players' locker room, a players' lounge, and a recruiting room; widened the concourse; and updated the restrooms and concession stands.

Notable entertainers who have performed at Breslin
Musical groups

Aerosmith
Anberlin
Backstreet Boys
Barenaked Ladies
The Beach Boys
The Black Watch (Royal Highland Regiment) Pipes and Drums
Brand New
Bush
Counting Crows
Daughtry
Dave Matthews Band
Death Cab for Cutie
Def Leppard
Extreme
Goo Goo Dolls
Incubus
Jimmy Eat World
KISS
Maroon 5
Meshuggah
Milli Vanilli
Mötley Crüe
Muse
No Doubt
Pearl Jam
Phil Lesh and Friends
Poison
R.E.M.
Razorlight
Red Hot Chili Peppers
The Smashing Pumpkins
Sons of Sylvia
Tool
Trans-Siberian Orchestra
ZZ Top

Individual musical performers 

Bryan Adams
Tori Amos
Dierks Bentley
Sarah Brightman
Garth Brooks
Cher
Kenny Chesney
Ani DiFranco
Bob Dylan
Don Henley
Whitney Houston
Jay Z
Toby Keith
Miranda Lambert
Lil Wayne
Ludacris
John Mayer
Craig Morgan
Nas
Ted Nugent
Dolly Parton
Katy Perry
Kenny Rogers
Bob Seger
Tupac Shakur
George Strait
Taylor Swift
Josh Turner
Shania Twain 
Keith Urban
Kenny G
Carrie Underwood
Kanye West

Comedians 
Dave Chappelle
Jeff Dunham
Will Ferrell
Kevin Hart
Larry the Cable Guy
Jay Leno
Conan O'Brien
Ron White
Other 
Cirque du Soleil
Capital City Comic Con
The Harlem Globetrotters
Sesame Street Live
Stars on Ice
Thunder Nationals
World Wrestling Entertainment
Winter Jam

Notable conferences 
 Order of the Arrow, National Order of the Arrow Conference
 Odyssey of the Mind World Finals, (2007, 2010, 2013, 2015, 2017)
 State of Michigan Democratic Convention (2018)

See also
 List of NCAA Division I basketball arenas

References

External links
 Breslin Center official website
 Breslin Center official Facebook
 Breslin Center official Twitter

College basketball venues in the United States
Sports in Lansing, Michigan
Michigan State Spartans basketball venues
Basketball venues in Michigan
Michigan State University campus
Event venues established in 1989
1989 establishments in Michigan